Say It Loud is an album by the band Sanctus Real. It was released on December 24, 2002 under Sparrow Records. This was Sanctus Real's first studio album, after three independent releases.

Track listing

Note
"After Today" includes hidden track "Jesus Metal (Slam The Devil)".

Personnel 
Sanctus Real
 Matt Hammitt – lead vocals, backing vocals, rhythm guitars
 Chris Rohman – lead guitars
 Steve Goodrum – bass, backing vocals
 Mark Graalman – drums 

Additional musicians
 Pete Stewart – programming, additional guitars 
 Brian Siewert – string sample programming (4)

Production 
 Christopher York – executive producer
 Pete Stewart – producer 
 Brent Hendrich – engineer  
 F. Reid Shippen – engineer, mixing at Recording Arts (Nashville, Tennessee)
 Dan Shike – mix assistant 
 Brian Gardner – mastering at Bernie Grundman Mastering (Hollywood, California)
 Brian Hayes – drum technician 
 Jan Cook – creative director 
 Benji Peck – art direction, design, illustration 
 Alan W. Abramowitz – front cover photography 
 Allen Clark – back cover photography

References

Sanctus Real albums
2002 debut albums
Sparrow Records albums